Madifushi as a place name may refer to:
 Madifushi (Meemu Atoll) (Republic of Maldives)
 Madifushi (Thaa Atoll) (Republic of Maldives)